Caledonia was a Spanish vessel that the British captured in 1804 and that new owners renamed. She made two complete voyages as a slave ship in the triangular trade in enslaved people. In 1809 she disappeared from online records.

Career
Caledonia entered Lloyd's Register for 1805 with Hamilton, master, Geddies (or Geddes), owner, and trade Liverpool–Africa.

Captain Hance Hamilton acquired a letter of marque on 20 September 1805. At the time he acquired the letter of marque his intention may have been to sail her as a privateer. A complement of 110 men is consistent with a privateer, which needs extra men to man prizes, but not with a merchantman or enslaving ship.

1st enslaving voyage (1805–1806): Captain Hamilton sailed from London on 16 October 1805, bound for West Central Africa and Saint Helena. Caledonia arrived at St Thomas, in the Danish West Indies, on 28 May 1806 with an estimated 280 captives. She arrived back at London on 26 October 1806.

2nd enslaving voyage (1807–1808): Captain William Miller acquired a letter of marque on 20 May 1807. He sailed from London 1 May 1807. Caledonia started gathering captives at Bonny on 5 August 1807. She arrived at Kingston, Jamaica, on 5 January 1808 with 344 captives. She left Kingston on 22 April 1808.

Fate
Caledonia, Miller, master, arrived at Portsmouth on 27 November 1808 from Lisbon, bound for Gothenburg. The Slave Trade Act 1807 had ended British participation in the trans-Atlantic slave trade so she could no longer continue in that trade.

Lloyd's List for 28 March 1809 reported that Caledonia, Miller, master, had arrived at Gothenburg. There is no mention of a Caledonia leaving Gothenburg in 1809–1810. That would suggest that Miller may have sold her there to owners who renamed her. Lloyd's Register and the Register of Shipping carried stale data from 1807 to 1813, though it is possible she reappeared during that time under a new name.

Citations

1800s ships
Age of Sail merchant ships of England
London slave ships